Giraitė is a village in , Varėna district municipality, Alytus County, southeastern Lithuania. According to the 2011 Census, the population was 61, down from 89 at the 2001 census.

References

Villages in Alytus County
Varėna District Municipality